Niillas Somby (formally known as Nils Somby) is a Sami political rights activist, journalist and photographer. He was one of seven hunger strikers during the Alta controversy, and lost an arm during a sabotage action.

The documentary film Give Us Our Skeletons (directed by Paul-Anders Simma in 1999) follows Somby’s quest to retrieve the heads of his ancestors, Mons Somby and Aslak Hætta, from the University of Oslo in Norway.

See also
Mons Somby
Give Us Our Skeletons

References

Norwegian activists
Norwegian Sámi people
Norwegian Sámi activists
Norwegian human rights activists
Living people
1948 births